Francis S. Levien Gymnasium is a 2,500-seat arena at Columbia University in Morningside Heights, Manhattan, New York City. Named for New York lawyer-industrialist Francis S. Levien (1905–95), it is home to the Columbia Men's and Women's Basketball teams and the Women's Volleyball team. It is also used for gym classes in between games.  Part of the Marcellus Hartley Dodge Physical Fitness Center, Levien Gym opened in 1974 as a replacement for the old University Gym, which is still used for intramural sports.

See also
 List of NCAA Division I basketball arenas

References

  

1974 establishments in New York (state)
Basketball venues in New York City
College basketball venues in the United States
College volleyball venues in the United States
Columbia Lions basketball
Columbia University campus
Indoor arenas in New York City
Sports venues completed in 1974
Sports venues in Manhattan
Volleyball venues in New York City